Vladimir Trapeznikov (born 13 September 1956) is an artistic director/production designer, and a member of the Union of Cinematographers of the Russian Federation since 1988.

Biography 
 1976—1981 Faculty of Drawing and Graphics (Kazakhstan Pedagogical Institute, Almaty)
 1987—1993 Faculty of Art, All Russian State University for Cinematography (VGIK), Moscow.
 Student of Soviet artist, graphic artist and writer, Pavel Yakovlevich Zaltsman

Filmography 
2008 Roses for Elsa a.k.a. «Roziy dlya Elzi» (Director: Ye. Konchalovsky)
2008 Moscow, I Love You! A series of short, multi-genre films about Moscow:
Etude in Bright Colors (Director: V. Chiginsky),
Queen (Director: A. Surikova),
Well, What Should I Tell You Muscovites… (Director: Ye. Konchalovsky),
Concert Suite (Director: G. Nathanson),
Real Life (Director: I. Okhlobisteen),
Melody of a Summer Night (Director: Ye. Kalinina),
Elevation (Director: M. Ibragimbyekov),
Shabalovka (Director: I. Kvirikadzye),
High-rise (Director: N. Dzhorzhadzye).
2007 Father a.k.a. «Batyushka», 8 episodes (Director V. K. Mischenko)
2006 One Love in a Million a.k.a. «Odna Lyubov na Million» (Director: V. Schegolkov)
2005 Vanechka (Director: Ye. Nikolaeva)
2004 Mirror Wars: First Reflection a.k.a. «Zerkalniye Voyni: Otrazheniye Pyervoye» (Director: V. Chiginsky)
2004 The Narrow Bridge a.k.a. «Uzkiy Most», 4 episodes (Director: O. Basilov)
2004 Countdown a.k.a. «Lichniy Nomyer» (Director: Ye. Lavrentyev)
2003 The Golden Age a.k.a. «Zolotoi Vek»  (Director: I. Khotinyenko)
2003 Dasha Vasileva. Amateur Private Investigator a.k.a. «Dasha Vasileva. Lyubitelnitsa Chastnovo Siska», 15 episodes (Director: A. Matyeshko)
2003 Money a.k.a. «Dengi», 30 episodes (Director: I. Dikhovichny)
2002 On the Corner of Patriarshy -3 a.k.a. «Na Uglu u Patriarshikh-3», 12 episodes (Director: V. Derbenev)
2002 The Impact of the Lotus a.k.a. «Udar Lotusa» (Director: A. Porokhovschikov)
2001 The Kopeck a.k.a. «Kopeyka» (Director: I. Dikhovichny)
2001 Sabina Shpilryan (Director: R. Fayentso)
2000 Temporary Insanity a.k.a. «Affect» (Director F. Kubiyda)
2000 On the Corner of Patriarshy -2 a.k.a. «Na Uglu u Patriarshikh-2», 12 episodes (Director: V. Derbenev)
1999 Work Russian Style a.k.a. «Rabota Po-Russkiy» (Director R. Kopelli)
1997 New Year’s Story a.k.a. «Novogodnaya Istoriya» (Director: A. Baranov)
1996 Shanghai (Director: A. Baranov)
1995 Dead Body a.k.a. «Myortvoye Telo» (Directors: B. Mirza and V. Filimonov)
1994 A Weak Heart a.k.a. «Slaboye Serdtse» (Director: Ye. Shinarbaev)
1993 The Place on the Gray Cocked Hat a.k.a. «Mesto na Seroy Treugolkye» (Director: E. Shinarbaev)
1992 The Inventor of Pharaoh a.k.a. «Izobretatel Faraona», 2 episodes (Director: G. Zemel)
1991 Celebrities on Tudor Street  a.k.a. «Znamenitosti na Tudor Street» (Director: M. Zimin)
1991 Kozi Korpesh I Bayan Sulu, 2 episodes (Director: A. Ashimov)
1990 Kaisar (Director: V. Pusurmanov)
1989 Galoshes a.k.a. «Kaloshi» (Director: M. Vasilyev)
1988 A Wolf-Cub Among the People a.k.a. «Volchonok Sredi Lyudei» (Director: T. Temyonov)
1987 Strange World of Desires and Hopes a.k.a. «Straniy Mir Zhelaniy I Nadezhd» (Director: B. Mustafin)
1986 The Tale of the Beautiful Aysulu a.k.a. «Skazka o prekrasnoy Aysulu», 2 episodes (Directors: V. Chugunov and R. Tazhibaev)
1985 Non-professionals a.k.a. «Nyeprofessionaly» (Director: S. Bodrov)
1984 My Sister Lucy a.k.a. «Syestra Moya Lyusya» (Director: Ye. Shinarbaev)

Author’s work 
2008 The Beast from the Bottomless Pit a.k.a. «Zver iz Byezdny» (Director: A. Ivankin)
2007 Hidden Costs or Visitor to a Fairytale a.k.a. «Skritiye Raskhodi» ili «B Gostyakh u Skazki»  (Director: G. Constantinopolsky)
2007 A New Moscow a.k.a. «Novaya Moskva»  (Producer: I. R. Bondaryenko)
2005 Quarantine a.k.a. «Karantin»
2004 Garpastum (Director A. Khamrayev)
2004 Evilenko (Director: David Griko)
2000 Martian Chronicles a.k.a. «Marsiyanskiye Khroniki» (Director: Anton Molok)
1993 The Man Departing a.k.a. «Chelovek Ukhodyaschy» (Director: Ye. Shinarbaev)
1989 Vengeance a.k.a. «Myest» (Director: Ye. Shinarbaev)
1988 Oderzhimiye Tyenyu (Director: S. Babayan)

External links 

 
 
 Vladimir Trapeznikov in kino-teatr.ru
 Vladimir Trapeznikov in film.ru

Soviet production designers
1956 births
Russian art directors
Academic staff of the Gerasimov Institute of Cinematography
Living people